John Richard Lewis (August 1881 – 12 September 1954) was a Welsh international footballer, who played his club football as a forward for various clubs in the south of England.

Playing career
Lewis was born in Aberystwyth and started his career with Bristol Rovers in September 1899, before moving to the South coast to join Southern League Portsmouth in May 1900. After one season at Fratton Park, he moved to the Midlands to join Burton United playing in the Second Division of the Football League.

After three seasons, he returned to the Southern League with Bristol Rovers in August 1904 where he won a cap for Wales in the match against England on 19 March 1906. Shortly afterwards he moved back to the south coast with Brighton & Hove Albion, where he spent one season before arriving at Southampton, his third south coast club.

Although rather small, Lewis was a clever forward but sometimes found his size a handicap against burly opponents. In his one season at The Dell, he formed a useful partnership with Fred Harrison as well as linking up well with fellow forwards, Frank Jefferis and George Smith. He made 24 Southern League appearances for The Saints and his 10 goals made him top scorer for the club in the 1907–08 league season.

Never able to settle long in one place, he spent the 1908–09 season with Croydon Common before returning to Burton United (now out of the Football League) in 1909.

References

External links
Croydon Common career details

1881 births
1954 deaths
Footballers from Aberystwyth
Welsh footballers
Southampton F.C. players
Portsmouth F.C. players
Bristol Rovers F.C. players
Brighton & Hove Albion F.C. players
Croydon Common F.C. players
Wales international footballers
Southern Football League players
Burton United F.C. players
Association football forwards